Grittenham may refer to more than one place in England:
 Grittenham in the parish of Brinkworth, Wiltshire
 Grittenham in the parish of Tillington, West Sussex